The 1997 NCAA Division I women's basketball tournament began on March 14, 1997, and concluded on March 30, 1997, when Tennessee won the national title. The Final Four was held at Riverfront Coliseum in Cincinnati on March 28–30, 1997. Tennessee, Old Dominion, Stanford, and Notre Dame qualified to the Final Four. Tennessee and Old Dominion won their semi-final Final Four matchups and continued on to the championship. Tennessee defeated Old Dominion 68-59 for their fifth national title.

Tournament records
 Field goal percentage – Kristin Folkl, Stamford, hit all eight field goal attempts in the semi-final game against Old Dominion, setting the record for field goal percentage in a Final Four game.
 Assists – Kellie Jolly, Tennessee, recorded eleven assists in the championship game against Old Dominion, setting the record for most assists in a Final Four game.
 Field goal percentage – Tennessee hit 29 of 49 field goals attempts(59.2%) in the championship game against Old Dominion, setting the record for the field goal percentage in a Final Four game.

Qualifying teams – automatic
Sixty-four teams were selected to participate in the 1997 NCAA Tournament. Thirty conferences were eligible for an automatic bid to the 1997 NCAA tournament.

Qualifying teams – at-large
Thirty-four additional teams were selected to complete the sixty-four invitations.

Bids by conference
Thirty conferences earned an automatic bid. In eighteen cases, the automatic bid was the only representative from the conference. Thirty-four additional at-large teams were selected from twelve of the conferences.

First and second rounds

In 1997, the field remained at 64 teams. The teams were seeded, and assigned to four geographic regions, with seeds 1-16 in each region. In Round 1, seeds 1 and 16 faced each other, as well as seeds 2 and 15, seeds 3 and 14, seeds 4 and 13, seeds 5 and 12, seeds 6 and 11, seeds 7 and 10, and seeds 8 and 9. In the first two rounds, the top four seeds were given the opportunity to host the first-round game. In most cases, the higher seed accepted the opportunity. The exception:
 Fourth seeded Tulane was unable to host due to a "facility/hotel availability conflict", so fifth seeded George Washington hosted three first and second-round games
Michigan State was involved in two overtime games, winning in  the first round against Portland then losing in overtime in the second round against North Carolina. Old Dominion was also involved in two overtime games, winning in the second round against Purdue, then winning in the national semifinal game against Stanford.

The following table lists the region, host school, venue and the sixteen first and second round locations:

Regionals and Final Four

The Regionals, named for the general location, were held from March 22 to March 24 at these sites:
 East Regional  Carolina Coliseum, Columbia, South Carolina (Host: University of South Carolina)
 Mideast Regional  Mackey Arena, West Lafayette, Indiana (Host: Purdue University)
 Midwest Regional  Carver–Hawkeye Arena, Iowa City, Iowa (Host: University of Iowa)
 West Regional  Dahlberg Arena, Missoula, Montana (Host: University of Montana)

Each regional winner advanced to the Final Four held March 28 and March 30 in Cincinnati at the Riverfront Coliseum

Bids by state
The sixty-four teams came from thirty-two states, plus Washington, D.C. California had the most teams with five bids. Eighteen states did not have any teams receiving bids.

Brackets
Data source

* – Denotes overtime period

East Region

† George Washington was a host as a #5 seed, as #4 seed Tulane's facility was considered inadequate by the NCAA.

Mideast Region

Midwest Region

West Region

Final Four

E-East; ME-Mideast; MW-Midwest; W-West.

Record by conference
Thirteen conferences had more than one bid, or at least one win in NCAA Tournament play:

Seventeen conferences went 0-1: America East, Big Sky Conference, Big South Conference, Big West Conference, Ivy League, MAAC, MAC, Mid-Continent, MEAC, Midwestern Collegiate, Missouri Valley Conference, Northeast Conference, Ohio Valley Conference, Patriot League, Southern Conference, SWAC, and Trans America

All-Tournament team
 Chamique Holdsclaw, Tennessee
 Kellie Jolly, Tennessee
 Ticha Penicheiro, Old Dominion
 Nyree Roberts, Old Dominion
 Clarisse Machanguana, Old Dominion

Game officials
 Sally Bell (semifinal)
 Carla Fujimoto (semifinal)
 Ray Bomeli (semifinal)
 John Morningstar (semifinal)
 Scott Yarbrough (semifinal)
 Judy Schneider (semifinal)
 Yvette McKinney (final)
 Dee Kantner (final)
 Violet Palmer (final)

See also
 1997 NCAA Division I men's basketball tournament
 1997 NCAA Division II women's basketball tournament
 1997 NCAA Division III women's basketball tournament
 1997 NAIA Division I women's basketball tournament
 1997 NAIA Division II women's basketball tournament

Notes 

NCAA Division I women's basketball tournament
Basketball in Austin, Texas
 
NCAA Division I women's basketball tournament
NCAA Division I women's basketball tournament
NCAA Division I women's basketball tournament, 1997